The 6th Army Corps was an Army corps in the Imperial Russian Army.

Composition
4th Infantry Division
16th Infantry Division
4th Cavalry Division

Part of
2nd Army: 1914
10th Army: 1914
1st Army: 1914
2nd Army: 1915
11th Army: 1917

Commanders
1877: Vasily Fedorovich Rall
1878-1883: Christopher Roop
1889-1900: Alexei Kulgachev
1900-1901: Oskar Grippenberg
1904-1905: Arkady Skugarevsky
1906-1909: Nikolai Khitrovo
1909-1910: Konstantin Alekseev
1912-1914: Alexander Blagoveshchensky
1914: Pyotr Baluyev
1914-1916: Vasily Gurko
1916-1917: Aleksei Gutor

References

Corps of the Russian Empire
Military units and formations established in 1877
Military units and formations disestablished in 1918
1877 establishments in the Russian Empire